Aphae Jeong clan is a Korean clan. Their Bon-gwan is in Sinan County, South Jeolla, South Jeolla Province. He worked as a grand chancellor and became Prince of Tanghe. However, he was banished to South Jeolla Province in 853 and was naturalized in Silla because he admonished Emperor Xuānzong of Tang about military.

See also 
 Korean clan names of foreign origin

References

External links 
 

 
Jeong clans
Korean clan names of Chinese origin